Chen Qianping (born February 1955) is a Chinese historian who is a professor and doctoral supervisor at Nanjing University. He is a member of the Academic Advisory Committee of the Chinese Academy of History.

Biography
Chen was born in February 1955 in Nanjing, Jiangsu, while his ancestral home in Jiangdu. After the resumption of college entrance examination, he was accepted to Nanjing University, where he earned a doctor's degree in history in March 2002. He is now a professor and doctoral supervisor at Nanjing University.

Works

Translations

References

1955 births
Living people
People from Nanjing
Chinese historians
Nanjing University alumni
Academic staff of Nanjing University